The Church of St Michael and All Angels, is a parish church in the village of Mitchel Troy, Monmouthshire, Wales.

History 
The village of Mitchel Troy derives its name from the Welsh "Llanfihangel Troddi" which means "Church of St Michael by the Trothy". The River Trothy passes north of the church on its route towards Monmouth.

Very little remains of the original 13th-century church. At one time there was a spire on the church tower but in the 18th century it collapsed, demolishing the north aisle.

The present building is largely the result of rebuilding works undertaken between 1873 and 1876 by diocesan architect John Prichard for the 8th Duke of Beaufort. Members of the Beaufort family were officers of the church throughout the 19th century.

Architecture

Exterior
The church has an unusual narrow west tower with a castellated ashlar belfry. In the south-west corner of the tower is a large quoin stone, inscribed Orate Peo Godfride et Johanne. Little is known of its origin but it is said to be a foundation stone. Central to the south side of the nave is a large medieval gabled porch, above it the roof has steeply-gabled dormers with trefoil-headed lights.

At the entrance to the churchyard is a lych gate roofed in graded stone. The 15th century churchyard cross is missing the cross and top, but it is decorated with ball flowers which are echoed in the pulpit and reredos inside the church.

Interior
The church has a richly-detailed Victorian interior resulting from the patronage of the Beaufort estate. The nave roof is supported by pitch pine, arch-braced collar trusses.

In the south aisle, on one side of the doorway is a Norman tub font which was recovered from the Rectory garden. On the other side is an elaborate marble font, designed by Prichard, decorated with water lilies, passion flowers and netted fish. To the west of the doorway, a large inscription on the wall reads "To the Glory of God this church of St Michael and All Angels, built AD1208, was reconstructed Aug 4th AD 1876."

During the 19th century reconstruction, an ancient stone altar was unearthed at the end of the South aisle, with five consecration crosses representing the five wounds of Christ. The slab was remounted under the East window of the south aisle, serving as an altar for the Lady chapel. Also uncovered during the reconstruction was a stone which had been used as a piscina, but was discovered to be the lid of a child's coffin of early date. The stone is now set in the wall of the south aisle. At the end of the north aisle is a black marble reproduction of The Last Supper.

Some notable stone corbels can be found on the walls of the church. Above the nave the corbels bear a portcullis (the Beaufort heraldic badge) and St. George's cross (at the time of reconstruction the church belonged to the Church of England). On the outside of the organ chamber are five decorative corbels depicting an owl, a daffodil, a hawk, a flower and a nest of small birds being fed by their mother. On the south wall is an otter with a fish.

The choir stalls originally had carved figures of angels with musical instruments, but these were stolen in 1995. They have since been replaced by finials showing oak, ash, holly, ivy, hawthorn and bramble.

Opposite the entrance is a stained glass window dedicated to the Reverend Everett who supervised the reconstruction of the church. In the south wall is a window dedicated to the wife of the Reverend Sneyd who gave the Lady Chapel in memory of his son. In the north and south aisles are windows dedicated to two soldiers who died in the South African wars. In the west end of the chancel are windows dedicated to the wife and daughter of the Reverend Talbot and the east window represents the Ascension. At the west end is a window dedicated to General E. H. Somerset of the Beaufort family who died in 1886.

Inside the tower, there are three historic bells which are inscribed:
 G Tyler: H Williams: C Warden EE 1710
 CACHMAI: Tyler: William: Tucker: Churchwarden 1656 (dating from the time of the English Commonwealth)
 Wm Robinson Rector: Phil Stead: Ch Warden EE WE 1723.

References

Michael and all angels, Llanvihangel Crucorney
Church in Wales church buildings